Sheynnis Alondra Cornejo Palacios (born May 31, 2000) is a Nicaraguan model, community developer, and beauty pageant titleholder who was crowned Miss World Nicaragua 2020. She represented Nicaragua at the Miss World 2021 pageant in San Juan, Puerto Rico on March 16, 2022 where she was Top 40.

Early life and education
Palacios was born on May 31, 2000 in Managua, Nicaragua. She studied at the Universidad Centroamericana and pursued a degree in mass communication. At the same time, she also played varsity volleyball for the university.

Pageantry

Miss Teen Nicaragua 2016
Palacios's stared into the world of pageantry began in 2016 when she won Miss teen Nicaragua 2016 pageant.

Teen Universe 
As Miss Teen Nicaragua 2016, Palacios represented her country in Teen Universe 2017, in Managua, Nicaragua where she was Top 10.

Miss World Nicaragua 2020

On May 16, 2020, representing the capital Managua, Palacios win the Miss World Nicaragua 2020 crown.

Miss World 2021
Against the COVID-19 pandemic the Miss World 2020 and 2021 Pageant was canceled. On 2022 in 70th edition of the Miss World pageant, Palacios represented her country at the Miss World 2021 competition in San Juan, Puerto Rico. Palacios was part of the Top 40 where the winner was Karolina Bielawska from Poland.

Reinado Internacional del Café 2022

Palacios's did not compete in the Reinado Internacional del Café 2022 competition because she was positive in the COVID-19 test. The same situation was for the representatives of Philippines, Puerto Rico, and Dominican Republic as the same time a week later the representatives of Cuba, Hong Kong and Guatemala withdraw for the competition.

References

2000 births
Living people
Nicaraguan female models
Nicaraguan beauty pageant winners
Miss World 2021 delegates